This is a list of seasons completed by the Kazzinc-Torpedo. This list documents the records and playoff results for all seasons Kazzinc-Torpedo have completed since 1964.

Soviet Hockey Championship

Note: GP = Games played, W = Wins, T = Ties, L = Losses, Pts = Points, GF = Goals for, GA = Goals against

From 1964 to 1966 Torpedo played at division «Vostok» of Class A2.
From 1977 to 1980 Torpedo played at the Eastern zone of Class B.
1966–67, 1979–80, 1979–80, 1985–86, 1987–88 seasons includes statistics of tournament for promotion.
1988–89, 1989–90, 1990–91 seasons includes statistics of tournament for relegation.
1991–92 season includes statistics of final tournament.

International Hockey League

Note: GP = Games played, W = Wins, L = Losses, T = Ties, Pts = Points, GF = Goals for, GA = Goals against

1995–96 season includes statistics of tournament for the 15th–28th places.

Kazakhstan Hockey Championship

Note: GP = Games played, W = Wins, L = Losses, T = Ties, OTW = Overtime/shootout wins, OTL = Overtime/shootout losses, Pts = Points, GF = Goals for, GA = Goals against

Torpedo missed the 1998–99 season because of their participation at the Russian Major League.
From 2007 to 2009 Torpedo competed only at final round, its farm team Torpedo-2 played at first round.

Russian Supreme League

Note: GP = Games played, W = Wins, L = Losses, T = Ties, OTW = Overtime/shootout wins, OTL = Overtime/shootout losses, Pts = Points, GF = Goals for, GA = Goals against

Supreme Hockey League

Note: GP = Games played, W = Wins, L = Losses, OTW = Overtime/shootout wins, OTL = Overtime/shootout losses, Pts = Points, GF = Goals for, GA = Goals against

References
 
 
 

Kazzinc-Torpedo